Dominic Peters (born 11 December 1978 in Acton) is an English rugby league footballer.

Peters played for the London Broncos in the Super League. He has also played for the London Skolars. Dom Peters has also played for London Wasps.

Early career
Dom Peters was introduced to Rugby Union at Gunnersbury Catholic School, Brentford, Middlesex.  It was here that he was recognised as a strong and powerful winger, scoring many tries over a few seasons with the 1st team, helping them on their way to win the Middlesex County Cup for three years in a row from 1995–97.

Dom Peters was seen as a shining example for all inner-city children wanting to get into professional sport after coming through the Broncos youth system. He was seen as a highly promising winger when injury-free.

Drug Controversy

London Broncos terminated the contract of Dominic Peters after he was handed a 12-month ban by the RFL for taking the banned drug stanozolol. Peters had the remaining 12 months of his contract torn up after he was banned for steroid abuse.

Representative Football
Peters was a Lancashire Origin player, despite being London born and bred.

Peters played in the first and only fixture of West Indies v South Africa in 2004.

Dom Peters is a Rugby Union international with Barbados.

References

External links 
London Broncos profile

1978 births
Living people
Barbados international rugby union players
Doping cases in rugby league
English rugby league players
English rugby union players
Lancashire rugby league team players
London Broncos players
London Skolars players
Rugby league players from Greater London
Rugby league second-rows
Rugby league utility players
Rugby league wingers
Rugby union players from Acton
Wasps RFC players
West Indies national rugby league team players